Alan Zemaitis (born August 24, 1982) is a former professional American football cornerback. He was drafted by the Tampa Bay Buccaneers in the 4th round (#122 overall) of the 2006 NFL Draft. He played in the Canadian Football League for the Hamilton Tiger-Cats and is an assistant coach for the East Lake Eagles High School Football team.

College career
At Penn State University, Zemaitis, a tri-captain, was a three-time All-Big Ten cornerback and was second-team All-America in 2005. For two straight seasons he was a semifinalist for the 2004 Jim Thorpe Award, given to the nation's top defensive back. Zemaitis helped lead Penn State to an 11–1 record and a Big Ten championship in 2005.  His three interceptions in the season finale at Michigan State helped seal a 31–22 victory that gave the Nittany Lions the title.

Despite a violent car accident in January 2003 that left him with several head wounds, Zemaitis played in every Penn State game over his four years and started 34 of his last 35. He finished his career with 181 tackles, and broke the Big Ten and Penn State single-season records with 207 interception return yards in 2003.

Professional career
Zemaitis was considered a good fit for the Buccaneers’ Cover 2 defensive scheme:. He played sparingly in 2006 (though not in a regular season or postseason game) due to injury and was released.

He was signed by Hamilton as a free agent on August 29, 2008.

Personal life
He attended Spencerport High School in Rochester, New York. Zemaitis' surname is of ethnonymic origin and means "Samogitian" (žemaitis) in the Lithuanian language.

References

1982 births
American football cornerbacks
Living people
Penn State Nittany Lions football players
People from Spencerport, New York
Sportspeople from Rochester, New York
Tampa Bay Buccaneers players